Dorsey Elementary School may refer to:
 Julius Dorsey Elementary School - Dallas Independent School District - Dallas, Texas
 Norma Dorsey Elementary School - Garland Independent School District - Rowlett, Texas